V class or Class V may refer to:

Automobiles
Mercedes-Benz V-Class

Ships

V-class ferry, owned and operated by BC Ferries
V and W-class destroyer, destroyers of the Royal Navy launched in late World War I
Greek V-class destroyer
U and V-class destroyer, destroyers of the Royal Navy launched in 1942–1943
British V-class submarine
British V-class submarine (1914)
Vanguard-class submarine

Railway locomotives
 GNRI Class V, a 4-4-0 passenger steam locomotive of the Great Northern Railway (Ireland)
 GNoSR class V, a 4-4-0 passenger locomotive of the Great North of Scotland Railway, later LNER Class D40 
 NCC Class V, a 0-6-0 steam locomotive used by the Northern Counties Committee
 NZR V class, a 2-6-2 steam locomotive
 South Australian Railways V class
 SR V Schools class, a 4-4-0 passenger steam locomotive of the Southern Railway (Great Britain)
 WAGR V class, a 2-8-2 freight steam locomotive of the Western Australian Government Railways 
 V class, a single unit Downer EDI Rail GT46C diesel electric locomotive for Freight Australia 
 Victorian Railways V class, a steam locomotive, used on the Victorian Railways in the period 1900-1930
 Victorian Railways V class (diesel-hydraulic), a single locomotive class built as the shunter for the Jolimont Workshops

See also
 Class 5 (disambiguation)